The Technology and Engineering Emmy Awards, or Technology and Engineering Emmys, are one of two sets of Emmy Awards that are presented for outstanding achievement in engineering development in the television industry. The Technology and Engineering Emmy Awards are presented by the National Academy of Television Arts and Sciences (NATAS), while the separate Primetime Engineering Emmy Awards are given by its sister organization the Academy of Television Arts & Sciences (ATAS).

A Technology and Engineering Emmy can be presented to an individual, a company, or to a scientific or technical organization for developments and/or standardization involved in engineering technologies which either represent so extensive an improvement on existing methods or are so innovative in nature that they materially have affected the transmission, recording, or reception of television. The award is determined by a special panel composed of highly qualified, experienced engineers in the television industry.

2020 Awards
The 72nd annual Technology & Engineering Emmy Awards were as follows.

 System to Measure Video Performances and Demographics across multiple platforms
 Nielsen

 Pioneering Development and Deployment of Server-side Ad Manipulation and/or Playout for Adaptive Bitrate Video Distribution
 mDialog, Anvato (Google)
 NBCU
 This Technology (Comcast)
 Seawell (Commscope)
 TimeWarner Cable (Charter)

 Development of Open Perceptual Metrics for Video Encoding Optimization
 Beamr
 Netflix
 University of Southern California
 Université de Nantes
 University of Texas at Austin
 SSIMWAVE
 Disney
 Google
 Brightcove
 Ateme

 Development of the Event Signaling and Management API Standard
 CableLabs
 Comcast
 Time Warner Cable (Charter)
 SCTE

 Pioneering Deployment of the Event Signaling and Management API
 Time Warner Cable (Charter)
 Arris (Commscope)
 Cisco
 Envivio (MediaKind)
 Harmonic
 RGB Networks
 This Technology (Comcast)

 Pioneering development of LED lighting for Television Production
 Litepanels LTD (Vitec Production Solutions)

 Cross-MVPD Dynamic Ad Insertion for Cable Network Video on Demand Content
 Canoe Ventures

 AI/Optimization for Real-Time Video Compression
 Harmonic
 MediaKind
 Ateme
 Amazon Web Services

 Invention and Pioneering Development of Intra-Pixel Charge Transfer CMOS Image Sensors
 Eric Fossum
 ON Semiconductor
 Eastman Kodak

 Standardization of SMPTE ST 2110
 SMPTE
 Video Services Forum

 Common Encryption
 European Broadcasting Union
 DVB

 Content Delivery Networks
 Akamai Technologies

 Standardization and Commercialization of Television – Broadcast, Hybrid Electrical and Fiber-Optic Camera Cable and Connectors
 SMPTE
 Association of Radio Industries and Businesses
 European Broadcasting Union
 LEMO
 Belden
 NEMAL

 OLED Reference Monitors for Creative, Technical, Quality Control and Client Viewing
 LG Electronics
 Sony Electronics

 Dynamic Metadata for optimal HDR and WCG color volume mapping
 Dolby Laboratories

 Advanced Authoring Format
 AAF Association (AMWA)
 Avid Technology
 BBC Research & Development
 European Broadcasting Union

 Pioneering secure cloud-based VFX project management and collaboration at scale
 Nelvana (Corus Entertainment)
 Shotgun Software (Autodesk)

 Development and Pioneering Deployment of Synchronized Local DMA Advertising Capability for DBS / MVPD’s
 Ampersand
 Comcast
 Charter
 Cox
 AT&T
 Dish
 Invidi

 Standardization of the ISO Base Media File Format
 File Format Subgroup under ISO/IEC JTC 1/SC 29/WG 3 (MPEG Systems)

 On-air Touch Screen for Data Visualization
 CBS
 CNN

 Development of Massive Processing Optimized Compression Technologies
 Amazon
 Ateme
 Bitmovin
 Brightcove
 Disney
 Encoding.com
 Facebook
 Google-YouTube
 Netflix

 Newsroom Computer System (NRCS) used to plan and automate the production of linear live to air or live to recording news program
 Associated Press
 Avid Technology

2019 Awards
The 71st annual Technology & Engineering Emmy Awards were as follows.

 Pioneering System for Live Performance-Based Animation Using Facial Recognition
 Adobe
 HTML5 Development and Deployment of a Full TV Experience on Any Device
 Apple
 Google
 LG
 Microsoft
 Mozilla
 Opera TV (Vewd)
 Samsung
 Pioneering Public Cloud Based Linear Media Supply Chains
 AWS
 Discovery
 Evertz
 FOX NE&O (Walt Disney Television)
 SDVI
 Pioneering Development of Large Scale, Cloud Served, Broadcast Quality, Linear Channel Transmission to Consumers
 Sling TV
 Sony PlayStation Vue
 Zattoo
 Early Development of HSM Systems that Created a Pivotal Improvement in Broadcast Workflows
 Dell (Isilon)
 IBM
 Masstech
 Quantum
 Pioneering Development and Deployment of Hybrid Fiber Coax Network Architecture
 Cable Labs
 Pioneering Development of the CCD Image Sensor
 Bell Labs
 Michael Tompsett
 VoCIP (Video over Bonded Cellular Internet)
 AVI WEST
 Dejero
 LiveU
 TVU Networks
 Ultra-High Sensitivity HDTV Camera
 Canon
 Flovel
 Development of Synchronized multi-channel uncompressed audio transport over IP Networks
 ALC NetworX
 Audinate
 Audio Engineering Society
 Kevin Gross
 QSC
 Telos Alliance
 Wheatstone

2018 Awards
The 70th annual Technology & Engineering Emmy Awards were as follows.

 Pioneering Development of Mobile X-Band Radar Trucks for Television Weather Forecasting and Reporting
 NBCUniversal Company Owned Stations
 Accelerated Media Technologies Inc.
 Enterprise Electronics Corporation (EEC)
 Automated Sound Conformation
 Sounds in Sync
 Synchro Arts
 The Cargo Cult
 3D Engine Software for the Production of Animation
 Unity Technologies
 Epic Games Inc.
 Cost Effective Crowd Simulation Tools
 Massive
 Golaem
 Basefount
 SideFX
 Pioneering Development of Packet Impairment Test Generator for SMPTE ST 2022 Digital Video over IP
 Packetstorm
 Development of a Ku Satellite-Based Communication System for Early Satellite Newsgathering
 NBC
 Conus Communications (Hubbard Broadcasting)
 Large-Scale “At Home” Production for Live Sports
 NASCAR Productions
 PSSI Global Services
 Big Ten Network
 Large-Scale Distributed Production for Live Sports
 NBC Sports
 Standardization of HTML5, Encrypted Media Extensions (EME) and Media Source Extensions (MSE) for a Full TV Experience
 W3C
 Microsoft
 Comcast
 Netflix
 Google
 Pioneering Reliable Transmission Method for Live Contribution and Distribution TV Links
 Fujitsu
 Qvidium
 Net Insight
 VideoFlow
 DVEO
 Artel
 Haivision
 Cobalt
 Zixi
 AVI West
 Streambox
 Dejero
 Pioneering Development of the Single-Chip Color Camera
 Peter Dillon
 Al Brault
 Hitachi
 NEC
 Panasonic
 Sony
 Toshiba

2017 Awards
The 69th annual Technology & Engineering Emmy Awards were as follows.

 Contextual Voice Navigation for Discovering and Interacting with TV Content
 Comcast
 Universal Electronics Inc (UEI)
 Apple TV
 Nuance Dragon TV
 Low Latency Remote Controlled Airborne Video Platforms (non-military) for Television
 John McGraw
 PictorVision Inc.
 Aerial MOB LLC
 Astraeus Aerial
 Flying Cam Inc.
 Vortex Aerial
 Helivideo Productions LLC
 Snaproll Media LLC
 DJI
 Pioneering and Productization of Supporting Digital Video Using SDI Over Fiber-Optic
 Bluebell
 British Telecom
 Pioneering Development of a Computerized Hard-Disk Storage Based Digital Non-Linear, Multi-Stream Multi-Camera System
 Avid Technology
 Heavyworks (Edit Share)
 Pioneering Development of a Portable, Battery Powered Audio/Video Test Signal Generator
 MultiDyne
 Development of Integrated Consumer Video Conferencing Service into Broadcast Production Environments and Workflows
 Skype (Microsoft)
 Video Identification Technology to Protect Content Value and Copyright
 Audible Magic
 Civolution
 INA
 Friend MTS
 Vobile
 YouTube
 Expanding-Side Television Production Mobile Units
 CBS Television Network
 The Gerstenslager Company
 A Three Dimensional Doppler Radar System to Track and Display Fast Moving Pitched and Hit Balls
TrackMan
 MLB Advanced Media
 ChyronHego Corporation

2016 Awards
The 68th annual Technology & Engineering Emmy Awards were as follows.

 Live Production Technology Beyond HD to Achieve Non-Interpolated Video for Instant Replay
 Evertz
 EVS
 FOR-A
 Concept of Opto-Electric Transduction
 Telcon (Alcatel Lucent-Submarine Networks)
 Society of Telegraph Engineers (Institution of Engineering and Technology)
 Siemens
 Development and Standardization of Media Object Server (MOS) Protocol
 Media Object Server (MOS) Group
 System for Executing Targeted Household Advertising on Linear Television
 Invidi Technologies
 Visible World
 Pioneering Invention and Deployment of Fiber Optic Cable
 Corning
 Bell Labs/Western Electric (OFS)
 Pioneering Technology to Automate the Digital On-Line Assembly of Broadcast Content
 IBM Corporation
 Laser Pacific/SCAA (Technicolor)

2015 Awards
The 67th annual Technology & Engineering Emmy Awards were as follows.

 Pioneering Optimization of Advertising Placement in Single Channel Linear Television Programs
BCS

 Standardization and Pioneering Development of Non-Live Broadband Captioning
Netflix
Home Box Office (HBO)
Telestream
SMPTE
W3C

 Open Modular Platform for Broadcast and Production Distribution and Conversion Equipment
Ross Video

 Development and Standardization of HDBaseT Connectivity Technology for Commercial and Residential HDMI/DVI Installations
Valens Semiconductor

 Phonetic Indexing and Timing
Nexidia Inc.

 Steganographic Technologies for Audio/Video
Nielsen
Civolution
Digimarc
Verance

 Pre-production Visualization System
Autodesk
Cast-Soft
Innoventive Software
Robert Abel

 The Concept of Scanning for Image Transmission
Alexander Bain

 Pioneering Development of Data Driven Traffic Systems for Multichannel Environments
Management Science Associates, Inc
Turner

 Development of Enabling Technology for High Density Video Switching and Routing Solutions
MACOM

 Closed-loop Statistical Multiplexing of Geographically Distributed Encoders
DirecTV
EchoStar
Ericsson
Harmonic

2014 Awards
The 66th annual Technology & Engineering Emmy Awards were as follows.

 Pioneering Development of 2nd Screen Navigable Mosaic for Direct Programmer Offerings to Consumers via the Internet
HomeBoxOffice (HBO)
Netflix

 Development of Low Latency Video Streaming Live Captioning Systems
EEG
XOrbit

Recommended Practice on Techniques for Establishing and Maintaining Audio Loudness for Digital Television

 ATSC (Advanced Television Systems Committee

Television Enhancement Devices
Apple Inc.
Roku
Microsoft
Sony
Tivo

Non-Live Large Scale Online Video Systems
Netflix
 Personalized Recommendation Engines for Video Discovery (PREVD) for MVPD’s
Jinni (search engine)
Think Analytics
Digital Smiths
Comcast

 Standardization and Productization of JPEG2000 (J2K) Interoperability
Video Services Forum
Media Links
Nevion
DVBlink, Inc.
Harris Corporation
Ericsson
Artel Video Systems Inc.
Barco–‐Silex
intoPIX
 Innovation in Improving Engagement Around Television in Social media
Twitter
Spredfast (formerly Mass Relevance)
 Secure Accelerated File Movement over IP including the Internet
Aspera an IBM Company
DataExpedition Inc.
Signiant
Unlimitech
OvO Systems
 Pioneering Delivery of Pay TV Linear Video to Consumer Owned and Managed Devices Over a High Speed Data Connection
Major League Baseball Advanced Media
Time Warner Cable
NBC Universal
Multi-format HDTV CCD Camera
Sony

LDK6000, DPM CCD Multi-format HDTV Camera System
Philips 

High-Definition Multimedia Interface (HDMI)
Hitachi
Panasonic (Matsushita Electric)
Philips
Silicon Image
Sony
Technicolor (Thomson)
RCA
Toshiba
High-Bandwidth Digital Content Protection (HDCP)
Intel

2013 Awards
 Development, Standardization And Productization Of The High Definition Serial Digital Interface
SMPTE
SONY
Yamashita Engineering Manufacture Inc. (FOR-A)

 Personalized Recommendation Engines For Video Discovery
John Hey (Adobe)
Netflix
TiVo Inc
YouTube (Google)
Amazon

 In-Camera Electronic Compensation For Lateral Chromatic Aberrations In External Lenses
Panasonic

 Inexpensive Small Rugged HD Camcorders
GoPro

 Pioneering Wearable Camera Stabilizer Platforms
Garrett Brown

 Pioneering Analog Video Repositioner
Steven Rutt
Robert A. Diamond

 Gesture Control Systems For Video And Games (Non-Touch Screen)
Microsoft
Nintendo of America - Nintendo's North American subsidiary
SONY

 Pioneering Work In Implementation And Deployment Of Network DVR
Time Warner Cable
Cablevision
Thirdspace (Velocix, Alcatel-Lucent)

 Pioneering Development Of Video On Demand (VOD) Dynamic Advertising Insertion
Time Warner Cable
N2 Broadband - Ericsson Television

 Development And Standardization Of The MPEG-2 Transport Stream
ISO/IEC JTC1/SC29/WG11 Moving Picture Experts Group

2012 Awards
 Eco-system for Real Time Presentation of TV Content to Mobile Devices without the use of Specialized Television Hardware.
Apple Inc.

 The Development and Commercialization of Analog Local Cable Video Ad Insertion.
Cablevision Systems
Channelmatic
HBO
MTV Networks
Starnet
Texscan-MSI, Inc.
Wegener

 The Development and Commercialization of Cable Interconnects for Local Video Ad Insertion
Time Warner Cable
NCC Media

 The Development and Commercialization for Digital Infrastructure for Local Cable Ad Insertion
DEC
Harmonic Inc.
Motorola
Cisco
SeaChange International
SkyConnect

 Pioneering On-Screen Interactive Program Guides.
Insight (now Rovi Corporation) 

 Pioneering Development of Event Driven Control Room Automation Systems for Production of Live Television Shows, which Encompasses Full Control of Robotic Cameras, Audio, Graphics and Video Sources.
Parkervision (Grass Valley)

 Pioneering Development and Deployment of Aspect Ratio Control Technologies and Systems For Letterbox Images within Consumer Devices.
Warner Brothers
Sam Runco

 Development of Electronic Mastering System for Large Scale Content Customization, Transcoding and Distribution.
Warner Bros
CBS Worldwide Distribution

 Pioneering Development of Multi-Room DVR. 
Time Warner Cable 
Cisco

 IRND Filter Technology for Digital Motion Picture Cameras.
The Tiffen Company
Schneider Optics Inc.

 Improvements to Large Format CMOS Imagers for Use in High Definition Broadcast Video Cameras.
Arnold & Richter Cine Technik (ARRI)
Canon USA, INC
RED Studios
Sony Electronics

 Lifetime Achievement Award
Manolo Romero, managing director, Olympic Broadcasting Services

2011 Awards
 Local Cable Ad Insertion Technology - Cable Digital Standards for Local Cable Advertising
 SMPTE
 SCTE

 The System for Automated Migration of Media Assets
 Samma  (Front Porch Digital)

 Pioneering Development of Large-Venue, Large-Screen Direct View Color Video Displays
 Mitsubishi Electric Power Products, Inc. - Diamond Vision Systems
 Shuji Nakamura, Professor / University of California - Santa Barbara

 Pioneering Development and Deployment of Active Format Description and Aspect Ratio Control Technologies and Systems
 ATSC
 SMPTE
 DTG - Digital TV Group
 DVB
 NBC Universal
 Ericsson - Ericsson Television
 Miranda Technologies
 CEA

 Development of Integrated, Deployable Systems for Live Reporting from Remote Environments
 David Bloom
 NBC
 MTN Satellite Communications

 Standardization of Loudness Metering for Use in Broadcast Audio
 ITU-R Study Group 6 / International Telecommunication Union (ITU)
 Dolby Laboratories, Inc.
 Communications Research Centre
 Dr. Gilbert Soulodre
 Craig Todd

 Development of Professional Tapeless Portable Acquisition Systems Using Affordable Media
 Sony Corporation

 Pioneering Development of Removable Solid State Media for Video Camera/Recorders (Camcorders)
 Panasonic Corporation

2010 Awards
Lifetime Achievement Award in Technology and Engineering
 Sir Howard Stringer, chairman and CEO of Sony Corporation

 For Development and Production of Portable Tapeless Acquisition
 Avid Technology, Inc.
 Ikegami Co. LTD

 The Belt Pack Distributed Amplifier Systems in Live Production
 Stan Hubler
 Dough Leighton
 Bob Cohen
 Charlie Butten
 RTS Systems, Inc.
 Clear-Com (HME)

 Development of Wireless Intercom
 HME (HM Electronics, Inc.)
 RTS Systems, Inc.

 Development of Audio Meta Data Process for conforming audio the ATSC digital TV standard
 Dolby Laboratories, Inc.
 Linear Acoustic, Inc.

 Enabling Standards for the delivery of television via broadband data systems
 CableLabs

 HD Super Motion Systems for acquisition, recording and Playback for Broadcast Entertainment and Sports Productions
 NAC Image Technology, Inc.
 EVS Broadcast Equipment, Inc.
 Vision Research (An AMETEK® Company)
 Grass Valley Group
 Sony Corporation

 Blue Laser Optical Systems for Consumer Playback
 Sony Corporation
 Royal Philips Electronics
 Panasonic Corporation
 TDK Corporation

2009 Awards
For its Audience Measurement Technology System
 NIELSEN CORPORATION
 ARBITRON

For its Pioneering Development in Electronic Prompting
 PORTAPROMPT
 COMPU=PROMPT

For its Pioneering Development of MSDC High Power Amplifiers
 L3

For its Pioneering Efforts in Development, Implementation of Network Distribution workflows for ATSC DTV Development
 FOX (Transmission Operations Center)
 PBS (The Public Broadcasting Service) 
 
For The Development of NTSC Television
 THE FEDERAL COMMUNICATIONS COMMISSION
 CEA (Radio Manufacturers Association) 
 THE NTSC 
 
For Pioneering Development of Automatic Transmitter Identification for Satellite Television Communications
 HBO (Home Box Office)
 ELMER MUSSER

2008 Awards
Lifetime Achievement Award in Technology & Engineering
 Ivan G. Seidenberg, chairman and chief executive officer of Verizon Communications Inc.

Serial Interface and Protocols for Server/VTR control
Harris Corporation
Sony

Delivery Confirmation Systems
XOrbit
Scripps Networks

Development and Standardization of File Formats for Video and Audio
Society of Motion Picture and Television Engineers (SMPTE)
Thomson Grass Valley

Pioneering Development of MPEG-4 AVC systems for HDTV
Tandberg Television
DirecTV

Pioneering RF Combiners for Adjacent Channels on Common Antenna Systems
Harris Corporation
Micro Communications Inc. (MCI)
Radio Frequency Systems (RFS)

Ongoing live global HD cinemacasting
Metropolitan Opera Association

Developing HDMI
Silicon Image
Thomson Multimédia
Toshiba
Sony
Matsushita
Hitachi
Philips
Molex
Japan Aviation Electronics (JAE)
Intel

Standardization of the ATSC Digital System
Advisory Committee on Advanced Television Service
Advanced Television System Committee
Advanced Television Test Center
Advanced Television Evaluation Laboratory

MPEG-4 AVC Standard
Video Coding Experts Group (VCEG)
Moving Picture Experts Group (MPEG)

2007 Awards
The Emmy Awards for ATSC broadcast transmission system RF filters:
 Electronics Research Inc.
 Dielectric Communications
 Harris Broadcast
 Micro Communications Inc.

The Emmy Awards for Development… of interactive Video on Demand infrastructure and signaling, leading to large scale VOD implementations:
 Time Warner Cable
 Scientific Atlanta
 N2 Broadband (Tandberg Television)

The Emmy Award for Coaxial cable technology:
 AT&T

The Emmy Award for Pioneering development of a fully monitored fiber optic based digital network… at shared use sports venues:
 Vyvx Services

The Emmy Award for Development and implementation of an integrated and portable IP-based live, edit and store-and-forward digital newsgathering system:
 CNN

The Emmy Awards for Monitoring for compliance standards for ATSC & DVB transport streams:
 Rohde & Schwarz
 Tektronix
 Thomson
 Pixelmetrix Corporation

The advanced media technology winners for Science, Engineering & Technology for Broadband & Personal Television:

The Awards for Outstanding Achievement in Advanced Media Technology for Best Use of Commercial Advertising on Personal Computer:
 The L Word in Second Life, Showtime Networks/Electric Sheep Company

The Awards for Outstanding Achievement in Advanced Media Technology for Best Use for Creation and Distribution of Interactive Commercial Advertising Delivered Through Digital Set Top Boxes:
 Axe Boost Your E.S.P. Interactive Channel Experience, Brightline iTV/Unilever

The Awards for Outstanding Achievement in Advanced Media Technology for Synchronous Enhancement of Original Television Content for Interactive Use (Two Screen Environment TV /PC or TV / Mobile Device):
 March Madness on Demand, CBSSports.com/CBS Sports

The Awards for Outstanding Achievement in Advanced Media Technology for Creation of Non-Traditional Programs or Platforms:
 MTV's Virtual Laguna Beach, MTV Networks

The Awards for Outstanding Achievement in Advanced Media Technology for Best Use of Personal Media Display and Presentation Technology (PSP, Cell Phone, Personal Media Player, Mobile Devices):
 Bravo To Go, Bravo

The Awards for Outstanding Achievement in Advanced Media Technology for Best Use of "On Demand" (Consumer Scheduled or Programmed) Technology Over Broadband Networks for Active "lean-forward" Viewing:
 MLB Mosaic, Ensequence/MLB.TV

The Awards for Outstanding Achievement in Advanced Media Technology for Best Use of "On Demand" for Passive "lean-backward" Viewing:
 Switched Digital Video: Revolutionizing TV, Time Warner Cable/BigBand Networks

Following are the winners for Engineering & Technology for Creation and Implementation of Video Games and Platforms:

The Awards for Game Controller Innovation:
 Nintendo DS, Nintendo,
 Wii, Nintendo

The Awards for Handheld Game Device Display Screen Innovation:
 Football & Auto Race – Mattel Electronics
 Atari Lynx – Atari Corporation
 Nintendo DS – Nintendo

The Awards for User-Generated Content - Game Modification:
 Pinball Construction Set – Bill Budge & Electronic Arts
 Quake – John Carmack & id Software
 Second Life – Philip Rosedale & Linden Lab

The Award for Physics Engines:
 Havok

The Awards for Development of Massively Multiplayer Online Graphical Role Playing Games (MMORPG):
 Neverwinter Nights – Don Daglow & Stormfront Studios, AOL-Time Warner, Wizards of the Coast,
 EverQuest – Sony Online Entertainment
 World of Warcraft – Mike Morhaime & Blizzard Entertainment

The Awards for Visual Digital Content Creation Tools and their Impact:
 Maya, Autodesk
 3D Studio Max, Autodesk

SOURCE: National Academy of Television Arts and Sciences

2006 Awards
Pioneering Development of On Screen Display (OSD) for Setup, Control and Configuration of Consumer Television Equipment
 RCA-TTE
Streaming Media Architectures and Components
 Microsoft
 Adobe Systems Inc.
 RealNetworks
 Apple
Pioneering Development for Combining Multiple Transport Streams Which Are Already Encoded, Using Rate-Shaping and Statistical Re-multiplexing
 Terayon Communication Systems, Inc.
Development and Implementation of Automatically Assembled Dynamic Customized TV Advertising
 Visible World
 The Weather Channel
Technology Advances in Serial Digital Interface Solutions, Enabling Over 20 Years of Seamless Studio and Broadcast Infrastructure Migration
 Gennum Corporation 
Privately Owned and Operated International Satellite Company Primarily for International Video Services
 Rene Anselmo, PanAmSat
Advanced Media Technology for the Synchronous Enhancement of Original Television Content
 DirecTV Interactive Sports – DirecTV 
Advanced Media Technology for the Non-Synchronous Enhancement of Original Television Content
 The-N.com Video Mixer – The N
Advanced Media Technology for the Creation of Non-Traditional Programs or Platforms
 The Slingbox – Sling Media
Advanced Media Technology for the Best Use of Personal Media Display and Presentation Technology
 Xross Media Bar – Sony Computer Entertainment
Advanced Media Technology for the Best Use of “On Demand” Technology Over Private (closed) Networks
 Time Warner Cable’s Start Over – Time Warner Cable
 Concurrent Computer Corp.
 Big Band Networks
 Harmonic Inc.
 Scientific Atlanta.
Advanced Media Technology for the Best Use of “On Demand” Technology Over the Public (open) Internet
 Stim TV – NPOWR
Advanced Media Technology for Best Use by Commercials in Creation and Use in Non Traditional Platforms and Technologies
 TiVo Interactive Advertising Platform – TiVo Inc.
Peripheral Development and Technological Impact of Video Game Controllers
 Nintendo, for the D-pad innovation on the NES/Famicon controller
 Sony Computer Entertainment America, for the Dual Shock Analog Controller.
Development of 3D Software Engines
 John Carmack
 id Software
Pioneering Work in Near and Real-Time Fully Programmable Shading Via Modern Graphics Processors
 Microsoft
 AMD
 NVIDIA Corporation

2005 Awards
RCA-TTE, For Pioneering Development of On Screen Display (OSD) for Setup, Control  and Configuration of Consumer Television Equipment
Microsoft, Adobe Systems, RealNetworks, and Apple Computer, Inc., For Streaming Media Architectures and Components
Terayon Communication Systems, Inc., For pioneering Development for Combining Multiple transport Streams Which Are Already Encoded, Using Rate-Shaping and Statistical Re-multiplexing
Visible World and The Weather Channel, For Development and Implementation of automatically Assembled Dynamic Customized TV Advertising
Gennum Corp., For Technology Advances in Serial Digital Interface Solutions, enabling Over 20 Years of Seamless Studio and Broadcast Infrastructure migration.
 The-N.com (a website associated with The N television channel) for Outstanding Achievement in Advanced Media Technology for the Non-Synchronous Enhancement of Original Television Programming, for the Video Masher.

2004 Awards

Ampex and ABC, For slow-motion color recording and playback for broadcast
ABC, PBS, and Consumer Electronics Association, For closed caption standardization
The WB and IBM, For pioneering development of locally integrated and branded content using IP Store and forward technology
Canon USA Inc., Fujinon, and Thales Angeniux, For lens technology developments for solid state imagers cameras in high definition formats
AT&T For the first intercontinental satellite TV transmission.

2003 Awards
Sharp, for development of Direct View Liquid Crystal Display Screens
Philips, for development of UHP Lamps
Len Reiffel, for pioneering efforts in the invention of the Telestrator
Echostar and DirecTV for pioneering Efforts in the Development of Spot Beam Satellites for Distribution of Local Broadcast Channels Directly to Home Receivers
nCUBE, Concurrent, and SeaChange, for development, productization, and commercialization of video server technology leading to large-scale VOD implementations

2002 Awards
Turner Networks For Pioneering Efforts in the Development of Automated, Server-Based Closed Captioning Systems.  Development was performed by XOrbit, also awarded.
Thales Broadcast & Multimedia For Pioneering Development of Digital Modulator Adaptive Pre-Correction for ATSC 8VSB Digital Transmitter Systems
Thomson Broadcast & Media Solutions For Development And Application Of Sub-Pixel Imaging Devices For Television Cameras
Dolby Laboratories, Jim Fosgate, and Peter Scheiber For Development of Surround Sound for Television
Texas Instruments DLP Products For Pioneering Development of mass-produced digital reflective imaging technology for consumer rear projection television
Dr. Kees Immink For Coding Technology for Optical Recording Formats
Pinnacle Systems (Montage) and Thomson Broadcast & Media Solutions For Technology to simultaneously encode multiple video qualities and the corresponding metadata
CBS Technology Center and Society of Motion Picture and Television Engineers (SMPTE) for their improved SMPTE color bars standard ECR 1-1978

2001 Awards
Plasma display by Donald Bitzer.  This revolutionized the television.
Final Cut Pro by Apple Inc. A one application, any format editing system.
Boujou Automated Camera Tracker by 2d3 Ltd. This innovation provides automatic shot tracking in a fraction of the usual time.
Arriflex Cameras by ARRI Inc. A Lifetime Achievement Award goes to this organization for fifty years of technological contributions to the industry.
TM Systems, for their language translation, dubbing and subtitling system.
Proximity Corporation for software for managing graphical assets for broadcast.

2000 Awards
 Digital upconverter by BBC, Faroudja, Leitch and YEM.
 Personal video recorder by TiVo and Replay.
 SFQ transmitter by Rohde & Schwarz.
 Consumer camcorders by Sony, JVC, Hitachi, Matsushita and Kodak.
 24p by Sony, LaserPacific and Kodak.
 Flat-screen CRT by Sony and Zenith.
 Shared video-data-storage system by Leitch/ASC, SeaChange, Thomson/Philips and Pinnacle.
 Digital asset management for television news by KGO-TV, CNN, ITN and Quantel.

1960 Presentation
Radio Corporation of America, Marconi's Wireless Telegraph Company and English Electric Valve Company for the independent development of the 4 inch image orthicon tube and camera.

See also
 Academy Scientific and Technical Award
 List of American television awards
 List of engineering awards

References

External links

Outstanding Achievement in Technical/Engineering Development Awards, from 1948 to 2006

Emmy Awards